Shvut Rachel is a former Israeli illegal settlement in the West Bank, retroactively designated a "neighborhood" of the settlement of Shilo, in the West Bank. Shvut Rachel sits between the Palestinian villages of Turmus Ayya, Qaryut and Jalud, part of whose lands were expropriated for building Shvut Rachel. Nearby Israeli settlements include Shilo, Giv'at Har'el, Esh Kodesh, Keeda, and Adei Ad. The village, administrated by the Matte Binyamin Regional Council, has a population of 100 families. The international community considers Israeli settlements in the West Bank illegal under international law, but the Israeli government disputes this. The Sasson Report in 2005 noted that the settlement extends over Palestinian land, part of which is owned by Fawzi Haj Ibrahim Mohammad from Jalud, turned over to the settlement after the Israeli authorities declared it state land.

History 
The village was founded in November 1991 in memory of the victims of a terrorist attack on a civilian bus; Rachela Druk of Shilo, a mother of 7, and Yitzhak Rofe, the bus driver - who were on their way to a demonstration in Tel Aviv. On the night of the funerals, a group of students from the yeshiva in Shilo as well as two young couples, including a pregnant woman who gave birth a week later, established Shvut Rachel. The settlers moved on to the land without government permission.

According to ARIJ, Israel confiscated  land from two Palestinian villages for the establishment of Shvut Rachel: 372 dunams of land from Turmus Ayya, and 963 dunams from Qaryut/Jalud.

In February 2012 the Israeli government approved the construction of new housing units in Shvut Rachel. This action was condemned by the High Representative of the Union for Foreign Affairs and Security Policy of the European Union, Catherine Ashton.

Legal status  

The international community considers Israeli settlements in the West Bank illegal under international law. Israel, on the other hand, differentiates between "legal" and "illegal" settlements, and Shvut Rachel was illegal even by Israeli standards until February 2012.  According to Peace Now, the Coordinator of Government Activities in the Territories legalized the outpost by redesignating it as a neighborhood of Shilo.

Midreshet Binat 
Binat is a midrasha located in Shvut Rachel. Headed by Rabbi Ronen Tamir, it was founded in 2000 as an additional branch of the nearby yeshiva in Shilo. It includes a regular seminary program, a one-month program in September for college students, and a joint program with Bayit VeGan Teachers College. It is associated with the Talpiot College of Education.

See also 
 Jack Teitel

References

External links 

 Shvut Rachel
 Shvut Rachel on Matte Binyamin communities page  
 Midrasha Homepage

Religious Israeli settlements
Mateh Binyamin Regional Council
Populated places established in 1991
1991 establishments in Israel
1991 establishments in the Palestinian territories
Community settlements
Israeli outposts
Unauthorized Israeli settlements